O Amor Está no Ar is a Brazilian telenovela produced and televised by Rede Globo, March 31 to September 6, 1997, in 137 chapters.

Synopsis 
The story takes place in the quiet and fictional city of Ouro Velho. Sofia Schneider (Betty Lago) is an exuberant woman of great class, intelligence, and solid ethical values inherited from her Jewish family, who emigrated to Brazil after the war. After the death of her husband, the aristocrat Victor Sousa Carvalho (Wolf Maya), Sofia takes over the business of the company Estrela Dourada, which explores water tourism in the local dam. But his mother-in-law, Úrsula (Nicette Bruno), does not accept the situation and begins a contest for control of the Sousa Carvalho family business.

Ursula has an ally, the unscrupulous Alberto (Luís Melo) married to his daughter Milica (Suzana Gonçalves). The relationship is complicated by Sofia's sister, Julia Schneider (Natália do Vale), arriving from Europe to join Alberto to remove her sister from the company.

Sofia has bigger problems at home. His daughter Luísa (Natália Lage), is a problematic adolescent and manipulated by her paternal grandmother. The relationship between mother and daughter gets more turbulent when they both fall in love with the same man, the aviator Léo (Rodrigo Santoro).

Cast

References

External links

1997 Brazilian television series debuts
1997 Brazilian television series endings
1997 telenovelas
TV Globo telenovelas
Brazilian telenovelas
Portuguese-language telenovelas